Russula adusta is a species of mushroom. It is a member of the Russula subgenus Compactae. The cap is brown to gray and somewhat shiny, with a mild taste and, reportedly, an odor of empty wine barrels. It has white spores. It can be found growing with conifers. Similar species include Russula albonigra and R. densifolia.

See also
List of Russula species

References

External links
Rogers Mushrooms – Russula adustavia the Wayback Machine
Savuhapero, svedkremla via the Wayback Machine

adusta
Fungi of Europe
Fungi of North America